Hüsamettin Böke (10 April 1910 — 26 December 1995) was a Turkish footballer and referee, who played as a goalkeeper.

Club career
Böke began his career at Vefa SK, playing for the club for seven seasons. 1932, Böke joined Fenerbahçe. On 24 February 1934, during a match against rivals Galatasaray at the Taksim Stadium, Böke was involved in a fight causing the abandonment of the game. The February 1934 clash is widely regarded as the spark of the present day rivalry. During his time at Fenerbahçe, Böke started in the 1933 Turkish Football Championship final, keeping a clean sheet in an 8–0 win against İzmirspor. In 1935, Böke started in a 3–1 final win against Altınordu. For the final two seasons of his career, Böke returned to Vefa, making 11 appearances.

International career
On 7 May 1926, Böke made his debut for Turkey in a 3–1 loss against Romania.

Post-playing career
Following his retirement from football, Böke became a referee. Böke was first listed as an assistant referee in 1951 and became a referee in 1957.

References

1910 births
1995 deaths
Footballers from Istanbul
Turkish footballers
Turkish football referees
Association football goalkeepers
Turkey international footballers
Vefa S.K. footballers
Fenerbahçe S.K. footballers